Vedran Jerković (born 13 October 1991, in Bugojno) is a Croatian footballer, currently playing for German amateur side 1. FC Schwalmstadt.

References

1991 births
Living people
People from Bugojno
Association football central defenders
Association football midfielders
Croatian footballers
NK Croatia Sesvete players
NK Istra 1961 players
NK Zagreb players
HNK Gorica players
Borussia Fulda players
Oberliga (football) players
Croatian Football League players
Croatian expatriate footballers
Expatriate footballers in Germany
Croatian expatriate sportspeople in Germany